Events from the year 1998 in Taiwan, Republic of China. This year is numbered Minguo 87 according to the official Republic of China calendar.

Incumbents
 President – Lee Teng-hui
 Vice President – Lien Chan
 Premier – Vincent Siew
 Vice Premier – Liu Chao-shiuan

Events

January
 1 January – The opening of Hsinchu Air Base in Hsinchu City.
 12 January – The renaming of Sports Council to Sports Affairs Council.

February
 16 February – The crash of China Airlines Flight 676 in Taoyuan County (now Taoyuan City).
 21 February – The opening of Museum of Medical Humanities in Taipei.

April
 28 April – The debut of My Fair Princess.

June
 16 June – The establishment of Hsin Tao Power Corporation.

July
 1 July – The establishment of Public Television Service.

August
 1 August – The establishment of Fisheries Agency of the Council of Agriculture.

October
 25 October – The opening of Kaohsiung Museum of History in Kaohsiung City.
 31 October – The opening of Beitou Hot Spring Museum in Taipei.

December
 5 December – The 1998 Republic of China legislative election.
 21 December – The ownership of Land Bank of Taiwan was handed over from Taiwan Provincial Government to Executive Yuan.
 24 December – The opening of Zhonghe Line of Taipei Metro.

Births
 10 February – Candy Hsu, singer and actress.
 4 June – Hu Ling-fang, badminton player.
 24 December – Shen Yan-ru, badminton player.

Deaths
 14 June – Chu Fu-sung, Minister of Foreign Affairs (1979–1987).

References

 
Years of the 20th century in Taiwan